is a voice actor for anime shows and video games. Some of his major roles are Regulus in Goulart Knights,  Seiji Yagiri in Durarara!!, Ryū Tsuji in Special A, Kaname Tanuma in Natsume's Book of Friends, and Snow Lily in Servamp.

Filmography

Anime

Film

Drama CD

Video games

Dubbing

References

External links
  
  
 

Living people
1976 births
Japanese male voice actors